Severe Tropical Cyclone Gwenda is tied with Cyclone Inigo as the most intense Australian tropical cyclone on record (with the possible exception of Cyclone Mahina), with a barometric pressure of 900 hPa (mbar) and was the most intense storm worldwide in 1999. Forming out of a tropical disturbance over the Arafura Sea on 2 April 1999, the precursor to Gwenda tracked slowly westward and gradually became more organised. On 4 April, the system developed into a Category 1 cyclone and was named Gwenda. The Joint Typhoon Warning Center reported that the storm had peaked as a high-end Category 4 equivalent on the Saffir–Simpson hurricane scale.

Increasing wind shear and an acceleration in forward speed caused Gwenda to quickly weaken. After moving ashore, Gwenda abruptly stalled before dissipating on 8 April. Although it was once an extremely intense cyclone, the factors that caused its deterioration also prevented significant damage. Minor structural damage was reported, and only localised flooding was recorded. Following its usage, the name Gwenda was retired at the end of the season.

Meteorological history

Severe Tropical Cyclone Gwenda originated from a weak tropical disturbance that formed on 1 April over the Arafura Sea.  Drifting westward, the system gradually became better organised, and early on 2 April, the Australian Bureau of Meteorology classified it as a tropical low. Over the following two days, the low continued to mature; on 4 April, the Bureau of Meteorology upgraded it to a Category 1 cyclone and named it Gwenda. Around the same time, the Joint Typhoon Warning Center (JTWC) issued a Tropical Cyclone Formation Alert as deep convection became concentrated around the centre of circulation and the system's outflow significantly improved. Located within an environment of low to moderate wind shear, the storm was expected to intensify.

By 5 April, the JTWC began issuing advisories on Gwenda, classifying it as a weak tropical storm and designating it as Cyclone 32S. Tracking southwest in response to a subtropical ridge to the south, Gwenda began to rapidly intensify. The barometric pressure decreased by 90 hPa (mbar), making Gwenda one of the fastest intensifying storms on record. At the end of the intensification phase on 7 April, the Bureau of Meteorology classified the storm as a Category 5 cyclone, the third of the season, with a pressure of 900 hPa (mbar).

Upon attaining peak intensity, Gwenda displayed a well-defined  eye surrounded by deep convection. Hours after attaining this intensity, increasing wind shear began to impact the cyclone, causing convection to become elongated and the eye less defined. Rapid weakening commenced as Gwenda turned southeastward towards the Pilbara coastline.

The cyclone continued to deteriorate as it approached Western Australia, with convection displaced ahead of its centre. In addition to the wind shear, Gwenda's forward speed suddenly increased, leading to further disorganisation. The JTWC estimated the storm to have been slightly stronger at landfall, with winds near . Shortly after moving inland, the JTWC issued their final advisory on the weakening storm. The Bureau of Meteorology continued to monitor Gwenda as it abruptly stalled just onshore. However, convection associated with Gwenda continued to stream southeastward due to high wind shear. The storm's remnants persisted for several hours before dissipating early on 8 April.

The Australian Bureau of Meteorology uses 10-minute sustained winds, while the Joint Typhoon Warning Center uses one-minute sustained winds. The Bureau of Meteorology's peak intensity for Gwenda was  10-minute sustained, or  one-minute sustained. The JTWC's peak intensity for Gwenda was  one-minute sustained, or  10-minute sustained.

Preparations, impact and records
Already suffering from the effects of Cyclone Vance two weeks earlier, which had destroyed or severely damaged 40% of the homes in Exmouth, residents in Western Australia heeded warnings of the impending cyclone. By 6 April, the Bureau of Meteorology had issued storm warnings for areas between Port Hedland and Exmouth. State Emergency Services throughout the threatened areas were put on high alert. Several offshore oil platforms were shut down and evacuated on 6 April and did not reopen until 15 April. Hours before the storm made landfall, the State Emergency Services stated that "Gwenda potentially had the destructive power of Cyclone Vance", and urged residents to seek appropriate shelter. Shortly before the storm struck, Len Broadbridge, director of the Western Australia Bureau of Meteorology declared, "Port Hedland is now in grave danger."

Despite the cyclone's strength, its effects were relatively minor. The police in Port Hedland reported severe damage to one house, but no deaths or injuries. Emergency crews were sent to the northwest coast of Australia to assist in cleaning up damages, but found no "major incidents" or significant damage as a result of the storm. A group of five people on a camping trip in the Outback were stranded by the storm, when heavy rains swept away their vehicle. The group "would have perished", but one of its members hiked non-stop for twenty four hours to a manganese mine where he contacted rescuers.

This rain caused localised flooding, especially in Nullagine where the river traversing the town broke its banks. The rainfall contributed to a long-term cooling effect in northern Western Australia, leading to below-average temperatures for much of April.

At its peak Gwenda was the strongest storm on record to form near Australia, surpassing Cyclone Orson in 1989. Gwenda held this record until 2003, when its maximum winds were eclipsed by Cyclone Inigo. Despite the minimal damage, the name was retired from the circulating lists of tropical cyclone names for the Australian Region.

See also

Cyclone Mahina
Cyclone Monica - Had the strongest maximum wind speeds ever recorded in the Australian badin 
Cyclone Inigo
Cyclone Lua

References

External links
 Joint Typhoon Warning Center (JTWC) .
 Australian Bureau of Meteorology (TCWC's Perth, Darwin & Brisbane) .

Category 5 Australian region cyclones
1999 in Australia
Tropical cyclones in Western Australia
Retired Australian region cyclones
1990s in Western Australia